Kobeřice u Brna is a municipality and village in Vyškov District in the South Moravian Region of the Czech Republic. It has about 700 inhabitants.

Notable people
Hubert Ripka (1895–1958), politician and historian

References

Villages in Vyškov District